Oswald Labs (formerly Oswald Foundation) is a Dutch-Indian based accessibility technology company that builds products for individuals with disabilities. It specializes in enterprise web accessibility, offers smartphone apps, and also runs a startup accelerator. It was established in 2016 by Anand Chowdhary, Nishant Gadihoke and Mahendra Raghuwanshi after their product, Oswald Extension, won an event at the AngelHack hackathon in New Delhi.

In an interview with The Huffington Post, Chowdhary stated that he believed "Oswald [Labs] can enable a Web 4.0, a web centered around accessibility and equality". Oswald Labs is named in honor of Oswald Berkhan, the German physician who first identified dyslexia in 1881.

History 

Chowdhary and Gadihoke started working together as students at The Mother's International School, as part of their computer club, MINET, which Chowdhary presided over. Chowdhary shared his idea of developing an accessibility tool with Gadihoke, and they decided to develop the extension during the AngelHack Hackathon Delhi in 2016.

After the development of the tool, Chowdhary and Gadihoke purchased the domain oswald.foundation on 14 August 2016 and founded Oswald Labs as Oswald Foundation on 15 August 2016 along with Mahendra Singh Raghuwanshi, Chowdhary's partner in previous ventures. Oswald Labs won an award at Startup India Rocks in Bengaluru and is a part of IBM's Global Entrepreneur Program. They are also incubated in the London and Berlin-based EyeFocus Accelerator, a startup accelerator program for companies developing for living with visual impairment.

On 8 April 2017, the organization qualified to the finals of The Economic Times's Catapoolt Changemakers Challenge after winning the first round in Delhi. On 17 and 18 June 2017, they organized BharatHacks, a hackathon to solve India-specific problems, in collaboration with DigitalOcean, IBM, the Delhi-NCR chapter of Facebook Developer Circles, HackerEarth, and other technology companies. In June 2017, they raised ₹100,000 in a crowdfunding campaign.

In September 2017, the firm moved parts of their operation to Enschede, Netherlands and in December 2017, Oswald Foundation was renamed to Oswald Labs to focus on research and development. In December 2017, they launched a startup accelerator for early-stage startups.

In October 2018, Oswald Labs exhibited smartphone apps for people with disabilities at the Dutch Design Week, in collaboration with 4TU, the consortium of Dutch technical universities.

In 2020, Chowdhary stepped down as CEO to start a new Swiss company Koj that offers a furniture subscription service with Carlo Badini, former CEO of Cleverclip.

Products and services

Agastya 
Agastya is a cross-platform JavaScript library and web accessibility plug-in for websites. It adds support for keyboard navigation, automatic generation for alternate text for images using computer vision, and font adjustment. It also includes a mode that adjusts the color temperature of the display to reduce eye strain and disruption of sleep patterns (like the program f.lux), a night mode that converts a webpage to a dark theme, and a dyslexia-friendly mode that uses Open Dyslexic and dyslexia-friendly colors. For uses with visual impairment, it has a built-in screen reader with summarization. Websites can also access analytics about their user's disabilities. It is available for free for websites with less than 10,000 pageviews per month, and has a subscription model for larger websites.

Shravan 
Shravan is a set of research-based products for smartphones.

Shravan OS 
Shravan OS is an operating system for smartphones and tablet computers based on the Android mobile platform. It uses vibrational and speech feedback as its primary user interface and is more accessible than regular smartphone operating systems. It can be used by people with dyslexia or visual impairment, senior citizens, and illiterates. It is also reportedly the first smartphone operating system with built-in Digital India technologies like Aadhaar integration and Unified Payments Interface payments. It works in over 25 native Indian languages. Shravan OS powers the affordable smartphone from Oswald Labs, Shravan Phone.

Augmenta11y 

Augmenta11y is a mobile app that which helps users with dyslexia read more easily. It uses augmented Reality and optical character recognition to display computer-generated imagery on top of books, signage, and other text in a dyslexia-friendly mode. Users choose their preferred typeface, line height, letter spacing and color scheme, and then point their cameras to pieces of text. The app also incorporates Agastya for read aloud functionality and is available on iOS, iPadOS and Android. It was developed by students from Mukesh Patel School of Technology Management & Engineering as part of their bachelor thesis and presented at Dutch Design Week.

The word Augmenta11y is a portmanteau of Augmented Reality and a11y, the numeronym for accessibility. In a research study, it was found that using Augmenta11y reduces reading times for school students with dyslexia by 21%.

Valmiki 
Valmiki, formerly known as Oswald, is a browser extension based on independent research  by the British Dyslexia Association and the World Wide Web Consortium to allow people with dyslexia or visual impairment access the web. Users with dyslexia can change the typeface to Open Dyslexic and colors to dyslexia-friendly colors, and visually impaired users can listen to the content available on a webpage. It also allows users to customize a webpage's typography and design based on their reading preferences. It is a free and open-source software available in the Chrome Web Store.

Accelerator 
In early 2018, the organization announced Oswald Labs Accelerator, a startup accelerator for early-stage startups. The program is equity-free and offers coworking spaces, legal support, business development and technology consultancy, and partnerships with universities and companies. Oswald Labs has partnered with Amazon Web Services to offer cloud credits.

References

External links 
 

Information technology companies of New Delhi
Software companies of India
Companies based in Overijssel
Technology companies of the Netherlands
Startup accelerators
Business incubators of the Netherlands
Multinational companies headquartered in India
Indian companies established in 2016
Technology companies established in 2016
Indian brands
Web accessibility
Assistive technology
Computer accessibility
Research and development organizations